The following is a timeline of the capital city of São Tomé as well as Água Grande District (since 1975, much of the district is covered by this city) in the island of São Tomé. São Tomé and Príncipe.

Before the 20th century
Between mid January 1469 and 1471 - The northeast of the island were discovered by the explorers João de Santarém and Pêro Escobar
1493:
The first successful settlement of São Tomé was established by Álvaro Caminha
Torre do Capitão (Captain's Tower) built
1522 - The city of São Tomé becomes colonial capital of the island
1534 - The city of São Tomé became a bishopric through the Bull "Aequum reputamus" of Pope Paul IV, the diocese of Tomé (now São Tomé and Príncipe) was established, also the Our Lady of Grace church became a cathedral
1575 - Fort São Sebastião near the town of São Tomé built
1576-1578 - Our Lady of Grace Cathedral made renovation works
1595 - 9 July: Rei Amador and most of the slaves took part in the Angolar revolt, they marched into the capital and were subjugated a year later
1598
August - Governor's office taken by the Dutch
October - Governor's office retaken by the Portuguese
1709 - Colonial office taken by the French
1715 - Colonial office retaken by the Portuguese
1753 - Colonial capital of Portuguese São Tomé and Príncipe moved from São Tomé to Santo António on the island of Príncipe
1784 - The front part of Our Lady of Grace Cathedral in São Tomé was in ruins
1814 - Our Lady of Grace Cathedral was restored again at the initiative of the local population
1848 - Benga king Bonkoro II from the island of Corisco (today, a part of Equatorial Guinea) moved to the island and the city after rivalries with Munga I who succeeded him
1852 - The town of São Tomé (now city) was again colonial capital of Portuguese São Tomé and Príncipe
1868 - Banco Nacional Ultramarino opened its branch in the island of São Tomé, it existed until 1975
1885 - The early São Sebastião Lighthouse in the island of São Tomé built
1890: - Ilhéu das Cabras lighthouse built north of the island of São Tomé
1910:
The Chief Expedition of the German Central African Expedition stopped by the island at Sāo Tomé at its port then left for the Congo
The German Central African Expedition led by Schultze and Midbraed stopped by the island at São Tomé at its port, the left for Annobón and the Congo

20th century
1928 - 10 November: São Sebastião Lighthouse built in São Tomé at the fort
1931 - Andorinha Sport Club of the island of São Tomé established
c. 1935 - São Tome Football Association (now as São Tomé and Príncipe (or Santomean) Football Federation) founded with its headquarters in the city
1947 -  the School of Nursing (now USTP's High Institute of Sciences and Health) opens
1951 - The city becomes provincial capital of Portuguese São Tomé and Príncipe
1952
the School of Nursing closes
21 September: Colégio-Liceu de São Tomé (São Tomé College-Lyceum) established, today it is known as Patrice Lumumba Preparatory School
1954 - Renovation of the Colonial Office (now the Presidential Palace)
1956 - Last modification of Our Lady of Grace Cathedral
1957 - Our Lady of Grace Cathedral becomes seat of the Diocese of São Tomé and Príncipe
1960 - Committee for the Liberation of São Tomé and Príncipe (now the Movement for the Liberation of São Tomé and Príncipe/Social Democratic Party), a nationalist group was established with its headquarters in the city
1962 - 22 November: Douglas C-54D-10-DC 7502 of the Portuguese Air Force crashed shortly after take-off for Portela Airport, Lisbon, Portugal, killing 22 of the 37 people on board.
1964 - 13 February: São Tomé Provincial (now Regional) Football Association founded with its headquarters in the city
1967 - The airport also served as the major base of operations for the Biafran airlift in Nigeria during the Nigerian Civil War
1969 - 6 October: Escola Técnica Silva e Cunha, today, the National Lyceum opened
1974 - 18 December - The city becomes seat of the autonomous province of São Tomé and Príncipe
1975 
July 12  - City becomes national capital of the independent Democratic Republic of São Tomé and Príncipe
Colonial office becomes the nation's Presidential Palace
BNU branch becomes headquarters of the Central Bank of São Tomé and Príncipe
1976
São Tomé and Príncipe Red Cross founded
11 July - Fortress becomes São Sebastião Museum
December: Vitória Riboque football (soccer) club established
1981 - GD Palmar football (soccer) club established in suburban Palmar
1982 
1 January: Correios de São Tomé e Príncipe opened its headquarters
31 December: the Escola de Formação e Superação de Quadros Docentes (EFSQD) opens, now USTP's High Institute of Education and Communications
1983 -  School of Training for Health Dr. Victor Sá Machado opens
1985 - STP-Press, a news agency opened its headquarters
1990 - 4 November - Headquarters of Democratic Convergence Party – Reflection Group (PCD-GR) opened
1993 
3 March: Headquarters of Banco Internacional de São Tomé e Príncipe (BISTP) opens
1 October: Air São Tomé and Príncipe opened its headquarters at the airport
1994
Ana Chaves Range Real Lighthouse opened
20 September: São Sebastião Lighthouse restored

21st century
2000 - Escola de Formação e Superação de Quadros Docentes (EFSQD) becomes Escola de Formação de Professores e Educadores, now USTP's High Institute of Education and Communications
 2001 - Population: 49,957 (urban agglomeration).
2002 - May: National Library of São Tomé and Príncipe opens in the subdivision of Náutico
2003 - School of Training for Health Dr. Victor Sá Machado becomes Victor Sá Machado Institute of Health Sciences (now the USTP's High Institute of Sciences and Health)
2006 - 23 May: A  HC-6 Twin Otter Series 300 of Air São Tomé and Príncipe crashed into Ana Chaves Bay in the north east of São Tomé Island during a training flight. There were four fatalities, and the aircraft was damaged beyond repair, also its airline company ceased and was later dissolved.
2007
High Institute of Sciences and Health opens, now part of USTP
A species of rock snails Muricopsis hernandezi described
2008 - STP Airways opened its headquarters at the airport and the city center
2014
STP held its 1st edition in the city
University of São Tomé and Príncipe opens with its main campus in the city
May: Africa's Connection STP opened its headquarters in the city

References

São Tomé
History of São Tomé and Príncipe
Years in São Tomé and Príncipe
São Tomé and Príncipe history-related lists
Sao Tome
Sao Tome